Merrigum is a town in the Goulburn Valley region of Victoria, Australia.

Merrigum Post Office opened on 1 February 1875.

Merrigum fields Australian Rules football and netball teams in the Kyabram District Football Netball League.

Golfers play at the course of the Merrigum Golf Club.

References

See also

 Merrigum Football Club
 Merrigum railway station, Victoria

Towns in Victoria (Australia)
City of Greater Shepparton